Diego de Aguilar, O.P. (1616 – October 1, 1692) was a Roman Catholic prelate who served as Bishop of Cebu (1676–1692).

Biography
Diego de Aguilar was born in Medina de Río Seco, Spain and ordained a priest in the Order of Preachers. On November 16, 1676 Pope Innocent XI, appointed him Bishop of Cebu. On November 14, 1677, he was consecrated bishop by Payo Afán Enríquez de Ribera Manrique de Lara, Archbishop of Mexico. He served as Bishop of Cebu until his death on October 1, 1692. While bishop, he was the principal consecrator of Felipe Fernandez de Pardo, Archbishop of Manila (1681), and the principal co-consecrator of Andrés González, Bishop of Nueva Caceres (1686).

References

External links and additional sources
 (for Chronology of Bishops) 
 (for Chronology of Bishops) 

1616 births
1692 deaths
Dominican bishops
Bishops appointed by Pope Innocent XI
People from Medina de Rioseco
Roman Catholic bishops of Cebu